Twice as Sweet is the third album by American dance/R&B band A Taste of Honey. The album was produced by George Duke and released in August 1980. It is notable for the heavily sampled "Rescue Me" as well as the band's cover of "Sukiyaki", which concludes the album.

Track listing

Personnel 
Janice-Marie Johnson – lead vocals, bass
Hazel P. Payne – lead vocals, guitars
George Duke  – keyboards, production
Donald Ray Johnson – drums, backing vocals
June Kuramoto – koto (on "Sukiyaki")
Cecil Hale – executive producer

References

1980 albums
A Taste of Honey (band) albums
Capitol Records albums
Post-disco albums